Üçkardeş can refer to:

 Üçkardeş, Ergani
 Üçkardeş, Hopa